Throughout history, rural spaces have held multiple meanings and served various functions for LGBT individuals and communities, ranging from sites for political organizing or sanctuary to sites of repression and violence for LGBT individuals.

Many popular representations of rurality as well as anti-LGBT discourse citing "protecting rural values" suggest these communities intrinsically place a heightened value on "traditional moral standards". Thus, communities in rural areas are associated with a lower tolerance for difference (including non-binary gender expression and queer sexuality) compared to urban environments. Some queer-identified individuals living in rural areas do experience antagonism, oppression, and violence matching the stereotypical representation of what it means to be queer in a rural community.

As of 2000, the U.S. Census found that 46 million people (roughly 16% of the nation's total population) live in areas with population densities of 999 people per square mile or fewer. Considering the high number of individuals and the small population density, the rural population of the U.S. exists across a wide geographical area. Despite the categorization based upon population density, "the rural population is not the same everywhere except in its distinction of not being urban". The variation within the category of rural is reflected in the multiple, varied experiences of queer-identified people living in rural areas.

In popular depictions, rurality is often portrayed as an inherently incompatible, or even hostile environment for individuals who are not heterosexual and/or cisgender.  While this may be an accurate contrast between some urban and rural settings, there is significant variation within each categorization based on population density.

Patricia Nell Warren's third novel, The Fancy Dancer (1976), was the first bestseller to explore gay life in a small town and to portray a gay priest.

Rural/urban dichotomy and visibility politics in the United States 
Queer regionalist scholars such as Mary Gray have illustrated that organizing for LGBT issues in the post-Stonewall U.S. has centered around a politics of visibility. Within this political framework, publicly claiming a minority sexual orientation is viewed as inherently political. Visibility politics claim that, by making one's own queerness visible, 'out' individuals resist heteronormativity and the erasure of non-heterosexual behaviors and identities as well as illustrate to their local, national, and global communities that queer people exist and need equal rights and protection under the law. Therefore, visibility politics view a public declaration of queer identity as the primary road to political liberation and equality for queer communities.

Visibility politics also creates an understanding of queer lives through the metaphor of the closet (which Eve Sedgwick terms the epistemology of the closet). Within the epistemology of the closet framework, LGBT persons are born 'in the closet' or with a repressed sexuality until the catalytic moment of 'coming out' at which point they become 'out' or publicly queer. Regional scholars have argued that the reliance upon the epistemology of the closet and visibility politics within U.S. queer activism is urban-centric, excluding and erasing LGBT individuals and communities in rural areas across the globe. As the majority of national-scale queer activism reliant on visibility politics within the U.S. emerged from its major cities, this ideology was "tailor-made for and from the population densities; capital; and systems of gender, sexual, class, and racial privilege that converge in cities." Mary Gray expands upon this point in her book, Out in the Country: Youth, Media, and Queer Visibility in Rural America:"..."metronormative" epistemologies of visibility privilege urban queer scenes. The systemic marginalization of the rural as endemically hostile and lacking the cultural milieu necessary for a celebratory politics of difference naturalizes cities as the necessary centers and standard bearers of queer politics and representations. Along the way all those not able, or inclined, to migrate to the city are put at a notable disadvantage not just by the material realities of rural places but also by the shortcoming of queer theory and LGBT social movement in ways we have only recently begun to explore."U.S. scholarship on queer life within metropoles further perpetuates the centrality of metronormative narratives of queer life and identity. John D'Emilio proposed a contradictory connection between capitalism and homosexuality. He argued that capitalism emphasized the importance of family units and reproduction as the primary function of that unit. However, simultaneously the anonymity of U.S. cities, a product of capitalist development, enabled networks of same-sex desiring individuals to form and a homosexual community and shared identity to emerge. George Chauncey is another historian whose work centered on queer life in urban centers. His book Gay New York examined how gay life in New York City formed around patterns of congregation and habit. Both D'Emilio and Chauncey highlight the ways that urban environments distinctly, and possibly uniquely, enable queerness. Thus, their findings to some extent reinforce a binary view of urban/rural wherein urban is perceived as a space for liberated, 'out' queer communities while rural is a space for isolated, 'closeted' queer individuals.

Studies and fieldwork by contemporary scholars prove the existence of queer lives in rural areas and challenge a systemic erasure of non-urban queer life. In particular, scholars of the American South and Midwest have written on queer life in rural areas, challenging the belief that rurality is inherently not conducive to queer sexual expression.

The presence of LGBT bars, bookstores, and neighborhoods within population-dense, urban areas makes the presence of queer individuals and communities more visible than in less populated areas; however, queer-identified individuals can also be found living in both densely and sparsely populated communities all around the world.

Research on migration patterns between urban and rural areas also challenges a binary view of the two categories as well as the common narrative that queer-identifying individuals 'escape' to the city over the course of their lives. In Coming Out and Coming Back: Rural Gay Migration and the City, authors Meredith Redlin and Alexis Annes find that the migratory flow between urban and rural is not unidirectional, but rather a series of movements over time between the two spaces. Their essay illustrates how queer individuals move within and between rural and urban areas in response to the ways that each space limits and/or enables their identity formation and sexual expression.

Rural queer lifestyle
In rural areas, the heterosexual family unit is valued as an essential part of life. It is the overtly dominant lifestyle in these spaces, which makes being queer a different experience than one would have in a metropolitan area.

Masculine and feminine gender representations operate differently for those in rural areas because work done by both genders is perceived as masculine behavior in other non-rural areas. Both men and women can exhibit masculine features and be perceived as normal. Many rural women work alongside men on farms or in construction work, thus certain types of masculinity displayed by rural women are not interpreted as lesbian behavior as they might be in an urban or suburban environment. As a result of female gender representations being more masculine for women in rural spaces, femininity operates very differently there, and thus so does lesbianism. This masculine dynamic allows for some lesbians to blend in quite easily, where typical female attire can be wearing flannels and cowboy boots. However, deviations in style, such as short hair or wearing ties, can still result in judgment from the woman's surrounding community. Emily Kayzak notes that "the sexual identity of rural butch lesbian women is not invisible in urban lesbian cultures, their more butch gender presentations do not do the same work in rural areas because those gender presentations are also tied to normative (hetero)sexuality". Generally, butch lesbian women are compatible with rural lifestyles as long as they can fit in with the typical masculine-female appearance. Rural spaces have even been referred to as makings for "lesbian lands", in part due to their ability to blend in.

For rural men, on the other hand, "publicly disrupting normative gender expectations arguably remains as, if not more, contentious than homoerotic desires". In many places, as long as a gay man subscribes to masculine representations and activities, such as wearing traditionally masculine attire and working in manual labor, acceptance comes much more easily. Deviations in appearance, like dressing up in drag, would be seen as very unacceptable, and can result in harassment. Male effeminate expressions and rurality are generally seen as incompatible. Many gay men in rural communities reject femininity and embrace masculine roles. Feminine gays typically face persecution and disapproval from their community members.

Queer individuals in rural areas, as in many other places, face discrimination and violence. In small rural areas, perpetrators and victims are typically both known to the surrounding community. Even police, who are intended to hold up the law, are known to commit crimes against sexually marginalized people. Brett Beemyn's review of John Howard's piece "Men Like That: A Southern Queer History" explains some of the roots of violent hate crimes and discrimination against queer people. In the 1960s, racists tended to depict African Americans as sexual deviants or perverts, which at that time included queer people. In addition, during the civil rights movement African Americans were known to have queer allies, thus stereotypes of racial justice supporters as engaging in deviant sexual acts became prevalent in the 1960s and the focus of discrimination spread to include queer individuals in a more direct manner.

In contrast, queer urbanites have gained much more acceptance and visibility as a result of gay rights movements and the recognition of the potential of the queer economy. Acceptance of queerness is also much more common in suburban and urban communities, because there is a higher acceptance of diversity in general. All cities have recognized, visible gay neighborhoods. Gay couples are more likely to live in urban areas than are lesbian couples, as the urban setting can be much more conducive to gay culture and life. Amongst those with higher income or education, acceptance is also more prevalent. These two points have led to an increase of the migration of queer people from rural communities to metropolitan areas. The cost of moving to a city filters out some with lower incomes, creating a class bias for those who are more affluent. Yet discrimination from community members, local police, and even state governments still occurs in urban spheres, although cities typically maintain a relative liberalism.

Assumptions made about queer rural spaces are sometimes crude. In media, rustic sexual expression can take the form of homosexual rape, as seen in Pulp Fiction and Deliverance, and bestiality, which is also a theme in these films. After James Michael Taitt died after paying to be anally penetrated by a male horse, bestiality became linked to country happenings, and induced a nationwide "bizarre sex panic". Heterosexual activities that are not heteronormative become contextually queer activities, some of which take place in rural areas, because they are viewed as a place to retreat and sexually experiment. Practicing dogging occurs, in which people can engage in public sex, voyeurism, exhibitionism, swinging, group sex, or partner swapping. Quiet roadsides and rest areas make for private places to meet, making cars vital for maintaining heterosexual and non-heterosexual queer interactions as well.

Rural queer farmers

Rural queer farmers face many of the same struggles as queer individuals living in rural communities. They face traditional farm values and gendered expectations for farm practices. Ideals such as feminine “labor of the home” and masculine “labor of the field” mark the conventional standard for gendered agriculture, but expectations of masculinity and femininity do not directly correlate with a particular type of farm practice for queer farmers. Some research has analyzed gay masculinities, for example, as possessing control over the construction of their activities.

Identity is an important component to the construction of queer farm life, as it is for queer existence generally. Gender research on queer rural farmers has considered the role of space in queer identity formation. Gender research on queer rural farmers has considered the role of space in queer identity formation. Berit Brandth, a sociologist and gender labor researcher, argues that attention to “identity and place and to the co-construction of rurality and subjectivity prompted more critical and theoretically informed approaches to the study of rural gender.” Julie Keller, a sociologist, analyzes the role of space in the construction of sexuality and gender from both a queer perspective and a heteronormative perspective. She theorizes that “complex meanings attached to space limits the tendency to reduce physical and social contexts” to one categorical assumption. In other words, understanding complexities of space limits the tendency to perceive “experience” as only a social situation; it is also a material position or "lived experience."

Janet Casey’s research provides an example of attention to the rural body and material conditions as they relate to predominant images—like “labor, health, childbirth, and childcare” Queer farmers grapple with these assumptions about a female laboring body, but they also grapple with assumptions about the nature-dominating male laboring body.

In the 1970s, women began to move to agricultural communes where they could live and work with other "country women".  In these communities, lesbian women built communes where they grew their own food and created societies away from men. They believed that living and working in nature allowed them to embrace their inherent connection with nature. Gay men also partook in similar activities; Bell and Valentine note how the Edward Carpenter Community in England hosts Gay Men's Weeks where they conduct events related to free-spiritedness and the embracement of one's sexuality.

Other communities of queer farmers prefer to live a more conventional lifestyle with a house and agricultural land of their own. The documentary Out Here portrays the lives of many rural queer people across the United States, and it shows how many queer people make a living and are making a difference in their communities through agriculture.

The documentary's creators also provide many biographies about queer farmers on their blog. The farmers documented have a wide variety of experiences, from being a specialty cattle farmer to an urban community gardener at a non-profit. The farmers surveyed state that they feel that farming provides a place where it is free to experiment, and is a place where queers naturally belong. They also describe the discrimination that they have faced throughout their agricultural careers, from social isolation to having fungicide dropped on them in the field.

Farmers and Friends, a helpline for closeted gay farmers in England, was created to help farmers deal with discrimination and to provide emotional support.  Many closeted queer farmers risk being outed by their communities, which could lead to loss of their livelihoods and community ties.

The eco-queer movement aims to draw attention to the intersectionality of nature and sexuality. Part of this intersectionality is the reason why many queer individuals may not feel comfortable in a rural setting due to the population dynamics that generally occur in these areas, which mainly consist of straight, middle-class, white men. Because of this, many queer farmers have taken to growing food in urban environments so that they can be agricultural while maintaining their queer lifestyles.

Queer rural political activism in the United States 

Queer political ideologies are linked to traditional political ideologies on the farm. The urban/rural divide can be understood in terms of feminist activism. Historically, rural agrarian women’s perspectives were overshadowed by “urban-based feminist perspectives” and “institutionalized (male) agrarian perspectives.”

The response for queer farmers is to adopt traditional practices from a queer perspective. Scholars of gender often consider how queerness engages components of traditional values while distancing from others. Brandth considers agriculture as constructing a situation in which attitudes of gender inequality converge with “new” egalitarian practices.

Traditional farm culture saw the body as a vessel for “traditional American values,” so long as it served reproduction and production. Community work in traditional rural life typically mapped unto to gender differences, with women’s community work seen as volunteer labors revolving around care, whereas men’s community work was economy-oriented, such as reform efforts In contrast, queer farmers often organize in family structures and labor structures based around community and ambiguous role-definitions. Jo Little conceptualizes the tools of queer farmers in terms of “cultural imaginings”—a notion which resists the narrow application of predominant cultural ideologies unto gendered expectations.

Today, Instagram functions as a site of activism, particularly to cultivate a queer farming community. Farming communities, such as @RockSteadyFarm, present political stances as valuable components of their farming practices, such as in hiring efforts. Similar queer platforms exist in online space.

Many queer political organizers believe reform is more difficult to pass in rural communities that are less tolerant of queer lifestyles. It is harder to mobilize communities in rural spaces where queer populations are less dense and financial contributions are limited. This has led to a divestment in formal rural queer political organizing. Because political activism has been silent in rural communities, many Americans assume rural queer people do not exist, or that they only do so only before moving to more urban and accepting communities. This assumption has created a misrepresentation of the US queer population. US Census data shows that 66% of South Dakotan same-sex households were located outside of urban areas. Queer communities exist outside urban areas, although they are generally less visible.

A lack of visibility and political attention has left queer people more vulnerable to institutional discrimination. Compared to the heterosexual population, they have reduced access to housing and healthcare and face greater employment discrimination. In South Dakota, only 29% of rural same-sex households own homes, compared to 84% of married heterosexual couples. There are generally fewer community resources and support groups for queer individuals in rural areas, as more limited local resources do not facilitate their existence.

Judicial rulings often neglect rural queer populations, using rural as a stand-in for intolerant or backward, which further entrenches structural discrimination against rural queerfolk. In a 2006 custody case, a mother found herself unfit to care for her child and relinquished rights to a queer caretaker. Once the new guardian's sexuality was discovered the court ruled against the biological mother's request, stating that "the adoption would not be in the best interest of the child." The court used rurality in their reasoning to reject the request, citing "stigma that the child may face growing up in a small, rural town with two women, in whose case she was placed at the age of six, who openly engage in a homosexual relationship." The court found the state of Georgia a more fit guardian than a rural queer couple.

Despite similar cases, many fights in rural areas are won in state courtrooms. The Iowa Supreme Court struck down the state's defense of marriage statute, which made it one of the first states to allow same-sex marriage, affecting the predominantly rural population. This action was met with political resistance. The Iowa electorate voted to not retain all three judges, marking the first time in Iowa's history that a judge had not been retained since 1961.

Many rural politicians have cited their reluctance to come out in support of same-sex marriage, for fear of similar political repercussions. Representative Paul Davis, the 2014 Democratic gubernatorial nominee in Kansas, voted against a constitutional ban on same-sex marriage three times in the state legislature, but did not take a definitive stance on the issue in his run for governor. More liberal and urban districts can offer public officials a politically safe place to take stances on issues that are not popular in predominantly rural states.

In recent years, the country has seen a shift in national public opinion on queer issues, which has spread to rural communities. In 2006, 71 Wisconsin counties voted to ban same-sex marriage, while only one county voted against the ban. Opinion has since overwhelmingly shifted. According to a 2014 poll by Marquette Law School, only 35% of voters in the Green Bay media market, a predominantly conservative area, still support the marriage ban, compared to 65% of the population in 2006.

Queer visibility plays a critical role in political activism, though this has not been a viable strategy for many rural queer people. Being openly queer can lead to more discrimination and isolation in rural spaces. Rural queer individuals have had to reimagine how to make political and social progress in their communities. New digital media has opened more political options for rural queer people. Social media is a means to expand local communities and allow rural queer individuals to take part in a larger queer community. Access to queer people's experiences are available on blogs and websites and provide access to the terminology needed to describe and understand their experiences. New media can give rural queer individuals the political tools and connections to make changes in their own communities.

See also
Queer anti-urbanism

References

Bibliography

 
 

Rural culture
LGBT culture